Juha Uotila is a Finnish professional ice hockey defenceman who currently plays for Kiekko-Espoo of the Suomi-sarja.

Uotila played hockey for the University of Nebraska-Omaha Mavericks. He played one season with the Toronto Marlies of the American Hockey League before returning to Europe.

References

External links

Living people
Lahti Pelicans players
IK Oskarshamn players
Finnish ice hockey defencemen
Toronto Marlies players
Omaha Mavericks men's ice hockey players
1985 births
Sportspeople from Espoo